Selin Oruz (born 5 February 1997) is a German field hockey player. She represented her country at the 2016 Summer Olympics.

Her brother Timur Oruz is also a hockey player who plays for the German national team.

References

External links

1997 births
Living people
German people of Turkish descent
German female field hockey players
Field hockey players at the 2016 Summer Olympics
Field hockey players at the 2020 Summer Olympics
Olympic field hockey players of Germany
Sportspeople from Krefeld
Olympic bronze medalists for Germany
Olympic medalists in field hockey
Medalists at the 2016 Summer Olympics
Female field hockey defenders
21st-century German women